Peerless is an unincorporated community in Marshall Township, Lawrence County, Indiana.

History
Peerless was platted in 1891. It took its name after a nearby quarry of the same name. A post office opened at Peerless in 1894, and remained in operation until it was discontinued in 1932.

Geography

References

Unincorporated communities in Lawrence County, Indiana
Unincorporated communities in Indiana